Rochester is a borough in central Beaver County, Pennsylvania at the confluence of the Beaver and Ohio rivers. The population was 3,480 at the 2020 census. Like many places around Pittsburgh, Rochester was a former industrial hub, home to the H. C. Fry Glass Company, and was a major junction on the Pennsylvania Railroad. Rochester has been a background for films, including the 1986 movie Gung Ho, the 1996 movie Kingpin, and the 2000 movie Wonder Boys.

History

What eventually became Rochester was originally a Lenape village called Sawcunk. The area was settled in 1799 in what was then the American frontier by white settlers and was known as East Bridgewater, Fairport, and Beaver Point. The borough adopted the name Rochester in 1834 when a local businessman who did regular business in Pittsburgh decided to christen his home with the name Rochester so he could have a unique name to stamp his goods; the borough was officially incorporated as such in 1849.

Many of the streets that run through Rochester today had different names based on wild animals. Virginia Avenue and Adams Street—two of the city's main thoroughfares via Pennsylvania Route 68—were once known as Fox Lane and Tiger Lane, respectively. Deer Lane, which still exists today, is the last remnant of the original naming scheme for the street grid in the borough.

Rochester is where Henry Clay Fry and his associates formed a glass manufacturing company following Fry's return from the American Civil War. In 1897 the Rochester Tumbler Company (as the company was known) became the National Glass Company of Rochester. The company helped to introduce pressed glass production to America, pressing the glass into a mold where previously the technique of cut glass had been to blow it by hand. At its height, the National Glass Company of Rochester employed over a 1000 people but its bankruptcy during the Great Depression began a long decline in the town's population which continues up to today.

Rochester was a railroad junction for the Pennsylvania Railroad and sat along the railroad's mainline from the Eastern United States to Chicago.

Geography 

Rochester is at  (40.703146, -80.283420).

Demographics

As of the 2000 census, there were 4,014 people, 1,732 households, and 971 families residing in the borough.  The population density was 6,861.5 inhabitants per square mile (2,626.8/km2). There were 1,900 housing units at an average density of 1,243.4 inhabitants/km2 (3,247.8 inhabitants/mi2).  The racial makeup of the borough was 83.81% White, 13.38% African American, 0.22% Native American, 0.20% Asian, 0.57% from other races, and 1.82% from two or more races. Hispanic or Latino of any race were 0.92% of the population.

There were 1,732 households, out of which 25.6% had children under the age of 18 living with them, 37.3% were married couples living together, 14.7% had a female householder with no husband present, and 43.9% were non-families. 37.4% of all households were made up of individuals, and 14.7% had someone living alone who was 65 years of age or older. The average household size was 2.22 and the average family size was 2.97.

In the borough, the population was spread out, with 21.6% under the age of 18, 9.1% from 18 to 24, 29.0% from 25 to 44, 22.3% from 45 to 64, and 17.9% who were 65 years of age or older. The median age was 39 years. For every 100 females there were 85.5 males. For every 100 females age 18 and over, there were 80.3 males.

The median income for a household in the borough was $30,970, and the median income for a family was $39,805. Males had a median income of $28,906 versus $21,576 for females. The per capita income for the borough was $15,359. About 7.2% of families and 12.2% of the population were below the poverty line, including 14.4% of those under age 18 and 11.1% of those age 65 or over.

Education
Children in Rochester are served by the Rochester Area School District. The current schools serving Rochester are:
 Rochester Elementary School –  grades K-5
 Rochester Middle School – grades 6-8
 Rochester Area High School – grades 9-12

Notable people
 Christina Aguilera, Grammy award-winning pop music singer
 Barney Cable, NBA Basketball Player 1958-1964
 Mickey Davis, basketball player
 Tony Dorsett, Pro Football Hall of Fame running back
 Henry Clay Fry, businessman, glassware manufacturer
 Mark Grater, Major League Baseball player
 Kirby Griffin, American football player
 Kris Griffin, Kansas City Chiefs and Cleveland Browns linebacker
 Vito "Babe" Parilli, All Star quarterback of the Boston Patriots' "Team of the 1960s"
 Major General Joseph Henry Pendleton, war veteran after whom Marine Corps Base Camp Pendleton was named
 Oliver B. Shallenberger, electrical engineer and inventor
 Mark Vlasic, American football quarterback
 Lauryn Williams, 2005 100m World champion sprinter and Olympic gold medalist and silver medalist

See also
 List of cities and towns along the Ohio River

References 

1799 establishments in Pennsylvania
Boroughs in Beaver County, Pennsylvania
Populated places established in 1799